The Archipelago is a township in central Ontario, Canada, along the Georgian Bay in the Parry Sound District.

The municipality consists of two non-contiguous parts, separated by Carling and the Parry Sound. The northern part includes the village of Pointe au Baril on the mainland and most of the geographic townships of Shawanaga and Harrison.  This covers the islands and shoreline of Georgian Bay from the Twin Sisters (at the northern boundary of Carling Township) north to Charles Inlet and the Naiscoot River, a few miles south of Britt. The southern part consists of the geographic townships of Cowper and Conger that includes the islands and shoreline of Georgian Bay southwest of Parry Sound, from Twelve Mile Bay (at the District of Muskoka boundary) to Wasauksing First Nation and up the South Channel almost to the town of Parry Sound.  Almost a third of the population of the southern part lives on the islands in the Sans Souci and Copperhead area, centred on Frying Pan Island.

The township is characterized by numerous islands (hence its name) and bays that attract large numbers of vacationers and boaters in the summer. Much of its area is undeveloped and crown-owned land: in the north, 96 percent of the mainland and 50 percent of the islands remain in the public domain, and in the south, 83 percent of the mainland and 70 percent of the islands, a large part of it protected in The Massasauga Provincial Park.

Communities

Bayfield Inlet
Blackstone Lake
Copperhead
Five Mile Bay
Georgian Inlet
Manbert
Manitou Dock
Naiscoot
Nares Inlet
Niweme
Ojibway Island
Pointe au Baril
Pointe au Baril Station
Sans Souci
Seven Mile Narrows
Skerryvore
Woods Bay

History
On January 1, 1980, the townships of Georgian Bay South Archipelago and Georgian Bay North Archipelago were formed out of unincorporated geographic townships from the Parry Sound District, primarily in order to provide proper planning in the islands and waterways of the area. These two townships were intended to be set up as one municipality, but the Ontario Legislature created two townships, with a provision for their later amalgamation, if requested by the elected Councils. Soon after the formation of the townships, both councils passed identical by-laws calling for the amalgamation of the two municipalities. Therefore, the Township of the Archipelago was formed on April 1, 1980, when the townships of Georgian Bay South Archipelago and Georgian Bay North Archipelago merged.

Demographics

Mother tongue:
 English as first language: 90.4%
 French as first language: 0%
 English and French as first language: 0%
 Other as first language: 8.6%

Education
The community is within the Near North District School Board.

As of 1975, Moon Island, within The Archipelago, was served by the Sugar Bay School. That year, it was one of 21 one-room schools in the province, and there were 12 students in grades 1-8 with ages ranging from 6 to 13. Moon Island residents who attended high school lived with relatives living in Parry Sound or stayed at boarding houses during the school year.

See also

 List of municipalities in Ontario
List of townships in Ontario

References

External links

Municipalities in Parry Sound District
Single-tier municipalities in Ontario
Township municipalities in Ontario